Impact is a 1949 American film noir drama film directed by Arthur Lubin, starring Brian Donlevy and Ella Raines. Filmed entirely in California, the film included scenes filmed in Sausalito, and at San Francisco's Fisherman's Wharf and other locations around the city. Impact was based on a story by film noir writer Jay Dratler. The supporting cast features Charles Coburn, Helen Walker, Anna May Wong, Philip Ahn and William Wright.

Plot

The San Francisco-based millionaire industrialist Walter Williams (Brian Donlevy) has a young wife, Irene (Helen Walker), who is trying to kill him with the help of her young lover, Jim Torrence (Tony Barrett). After Walter and Irene make plans to drive to Lake Tahoe, Irene feigns illness and asks Walter to instead give Torrence, who is pretending to be Irene's "cousin" from Illinois, a lift to Denver, allowing Torrence a chance to murder Walter en route.

The plan falls apart when Williams survives a hit on the head from the would-be killer. Attempting to flee the scene in Williams' Packard convertible, Torrence dies in a fiery head-on collision with a gasoline tanker truck. The body of Torrence is mistakenly identified as Williams. In the meantime, Irene has made reservations at a hotel in Oakland for her and her boyfriend to meet afterwards, under the assumed names of "Mr. & Mrs. Jack Burns".

The wounded, dazed Williams passes out in the back of a moving van and ends up in the small town of Larkspur, Idaho. Using the name "Bill Walker", he gets a job as a service station mechanic and falls in love with Marsha Peters (Ella Raines), a young widow who is the station's owner, whose husband was killed in the Battle of Okinawa. Meanwhile, the police arrest Williams' wife for his "murder".

Williams eventually tells Marsha the truth, and she persuades him to go back to clear his wife. When he does he is expediently charged by the incompetent and naive district attorney with murdering Torrence, due to the lies of his wife, against whom charges are dismissed.

Marsha enlists the help of the wise, expert police detective, Lt. Tom Quincy (Charles Coburn) to prove Walter's innocence. With the additional evidence of the housekeeper Su Lin (Anna May Wong), the hotel key is found, leading them to Torrence's suitcase at the hotel, and Walter is freed. His wife is then rearrested, this time charged with conspiracy to murder. Walter returns to his executive position, and Walter and Marsha decide to move to Denver, Colorado.

Cast

Production
Arthur Lubin signed to direct in June 1948. Harry Popkin raised the budget of $900,000. Filming began in San Francisco on September 14.

The "Bayview Apartments" - the site of the Williams' Nob Hill penthouse - in actuality is Weeks and Day's historic Brocklebank Apartments at 1000 Mason Street in San Francisco. The actual town of Larkspur, California was used for filming the fictional town of Larkspur, Idaho. Several areas in and around Larkspur can be seen, including the Probert family's home and gas station at 234 and 238 Magnolia Avenue, the location that was recently occupied by The Tavern at Lark Creek. Since 2015, the grand old house has been the home of Perry's Restaurant, a popular sports bar inside, but with the same quiet beauty in the outside dining areas.

This was Anna May Wong's first screen appearance since 1942. Character actor Tom Greenway made his first appearance on screen as an unnamed moving van driver. Gossip reporter Sheilah Graham appears as herself, reading a news item about the case on the radio.

Product placement
In the 1940s, it was still uncommon for brand name products to be seen in movies, but this was a notable exception. Walter Williams' Packard convertible and a Bekins moving van are prominent in several scenes. The movie trade paper Harrison's Reports typically called attention to cases in which such products appeared on screen, and always took a stand against that practice. Although its review did not mention Packard or Bekins, the Harrison's review noted "advertising plugs worked in for such products as Pabst Blue Ribbon beer, Raleigh cigarettes, Coca-Cola, Mission Orange soda pop, Mobil gasoline, oil and tires, Gruen watches, and the trade name Rexall."

In addition, Laykin et Cie (of I. Magnin & Co) is featured in the opening credits. Laykin et Cie was a leading West Coast jeweler during the period with an important salon in San Francisco during the time the movie was shot in 1948. In the opening scenes, Donlevy's character Walter Williams presents his wife with a custom Laykin et Cie intertwined diamond double heart brooch with the initials "IW" (for Irene Williams) which was produced for the film. Throughout the film, Irene Williams continues to wear various Laykin et Cie jewels of the period.

Reception

Critical response
At the time of release, the film critic for The New York Times, Bosley Crowther, in reviewing Impact panned the script and plot, writing, "If anyone seeing this picture is willing to string along with that as a fair definition of 'impact,' we can't vouch for the film's appeal to him. For it seems fairly obvious that the authors have geared their intellects to the suppositional level of that phony lexicon. And everything which happens in the picture is as cheaply opportunist and contrived as that arbitrary definition. You either swallow it whole—or you don't. Frankly, your correspondent doesn't."

More recently, critic Gary W. Tooze praised Impact as the quintessential B film: "As far as 'modest' film noirs go, this is one of the best. A simple plot idea is twisted to the max for late 1940s audiences."<ref>Tooze, Gary W. [http://www.dvdbeaver.com/film/DVDReviews10/impact_.htm "Review: 'Impact."] dvdbeaver.com. Retrieved: 5 August 2013.</ref>Diabolique called it "a solid film noir with a decent cast and typically brisk handling; Lubin may not have been strong with horror, which depends heavily on mood, but with thrillers, which benefited from speed, he was fine."

See also
 List of films in the public domain in the United States

References
Notes

Bibliography

 Harrison, Peter S. Harrison's Reports and Film Reviews, Volume 10''. New York: Harrison's Reports, 1949. .

External links

 
 
 
 
 Impact at Rotten Tomatoes
 
Review of film at Variety

1949 films
1949 crime drama films
American black-and-white films
American crime drama films
1940s English-language films
Film noir
Films directed by Arthur Lubin
Films scored by Michel Michelet
Films set in California
Films set in Idaho
United Artists films
1940s American films